Pseudocobelura is a genus of beetles in the family Cerambycidae, containing the following species:

 Pseudocobelura prolixa (Bates, 1864)
 Pseudocobelura succincta Monné & Martins, 1976

References

Acanthocinini